Paliperidone palmitate (PP), sold under the brand name Invega Sustenna among others, is an atypical antipsychotic which is used in the treatment of schizophrenia and schizoaffective disorder. It is an antipsychotic ester – specifically the palmitate ester of paliperidone – and acts as a long-lasting form of paliperidone. Paliperidone palmitate is formulated as an aqueous suspension and is administered by intramuscular injection into deltoid or gluteal muscle once every 1 or 3 months depending on the formulation. A formulation for injection once every 6 months is also pending regulatory approval as of September 2021.

With the once-monthly formulation of paliperidone palmitate, the time to peak is 13 days and the elimination half-life is 25 to 49 days, and with the 3-month formulation, the time to peak is 30 to 33 days and the half-life is 84 to 95 days via deltoid muscle and 118 to 139 days gluteally. The peak-to-trough ratio of paliperidone palmitate at steady state ranges from 1.56 to 1.70 with the 1- and 3-month formulations. The 3-month formulation of paliperidone palmitate has larger crystal sizes than the 1-month formulation and this allows for its longer duration. No pharmacokinetic data for the 6-month formulation has been released as of January 2021.

References

External links 
 

Antipsychotic esters
Atypical antipsychotics
Benzisoxazoles
Fluoroarenes
Lactams
Mood stabilizers
Palmitate esters
Piperidines
Prodrugs
Prolactin releasers
Pyridopyrimidines